Department Store Princess (German: Die Warenhausprinzessin) is a 1926 German silent film directed by Heinz Paul and starring Hella Moja, Hans Albers and Paul Heidemann. No copies of the film are known to survive.

The film's sets were designed by the art director Karl Machus.

Synopsis
An exiled Russian Princess is so impoverished that she begins working as a mannequin in the clothes section of a department store.

Cast
In alphabetical order
Hans Albers
Karl Beckersachs
Oreste Bilancia
Julius Falkenstein
Paul Graetz
Paul Heidemann as decorator in the department store 
Lotte Lorring as saleswoman in the laundry department
Hella Moja as impoverished Russian princess
Albert Paulig
Hermann Picha
Vicky Werckmeister
Hugo Werner-Kahle

References

External links

Films of the Weimar Republic
Films directed by Heinz Paul
Films set in department stores
German silent feature films
German black-and-white films
Lost German films